Subalaya College is an aided junior college located at Subalaya in Birmaharajpur subdivision, Subarnapur district, Odisha, India. It is a 10+2 Arts college and located on the bank of river Mahanadi.

See also
Education in India

References

External links
Department of Higher Education Orissa-Aided Junior College

Universities and colleges in Odisha
Education in Subarnapur district
Educational institutions in India with year of establishment missing